The 2021–22 Second Men's League of Serbia is the 16th season of the Second Basketball League of Serbia, the 2nd-tier men's professional basketball league in Serbia.

Teams
A total of 16 teams participated in the 2021–22 Second Men's League of Serbia, divided into two geographical groups with 8 clubs.

In August 2021, the Basketball Federation of Serbia confirmed a disaffiliation of Fair Play and their merge into Spartak. Spartak took the Fair Play's spot for the   2021–22 season.

Promotion and relegation

Venues and locations

Head coaches

Regular season

Group A

Group B

Post-season

Playoff

Playout

See also
 2021–22 Basketball League of Serbia
 2021–22 Basketball Cup of Serbia

References

External links
 Official website of Second Basketball League
 League Standings at eurobasket.com
 League Standings at srbijasport.net

Second Basketball League of Serbia
Serbia
Basketball